12th Group may refer to:

 No. 12 Group RAF, a unit of the United Kingdom Royal Air Force
 12th Special Forces Group, a unit of the United States Army

See also
 Twelfth Army (disambiguation)
 XII Corps (disambiguation)
 12th Division (disambiguation)
 12th Brigade (disambiguation) 
 12th Regiment (disambiguation)
 12th Battalion (disambiguation)
 12 Squadron (disambiguation)